Khatamabad may refer to:
 Khatamabad, Golestan
 Khatamabad, Kermanshah
 Khatamabad, Markazi